A northern accent, in general, is an accent characteristic of the northern part of any country or region. With reference to the English language, the term usually refers to either of:

United States:
North Central American English
Inland Northern American English
General American Midwestern
Western American English
United Kingdom:
 Northern England English